The Diocese of Lari Castellum (Dioecesis Laritana) is a suppressed and titular see of the Catholic Church. province of Mauritania Caesariensis. Lari Castle is centered on Imilaën in modern Algeria and  the current titular bishop is Ramiro Díaz Sánchez, OMI, former vicar apostolic of Machiques.

Known bishops
 Restitutus (mentioned in 411 ) (a Donatist bishop) 
 Carlos Riu Anglés (September 10, 1964 – November 28, 1971) 
 Michele Giordano, Archbishop of Matera (December 23, 1971 – June 12, 1974) 
 Alfredo José Rodríguez Figueroa † (24 July 1974 – 12 March 1987) 
 Rodolfo Francisco Bobadilla Mata, CM (May 15, 1987 – September 28, 1996) 
 Ramiro Díaz Sánchez, OMI, from 24 January 1997

See also 
 List of Catholic titular sees

References

 
Ancient Algeria
7th-century disestablishments in the Exarchate of Africa
Archaeological sites in Algeria
Roman towns and cities in Algeria
Former populated places in Algeria
Ancient Berber cities
Catholic titular sees in Africa